The Pakistan women's national cricket team toured the West Indies in August and September 2011. They played the West Indies in four One Day Internationals and four Twenty20 Internationals, with the West Indies winning both series 3–1.

Squads

WODI Series

1st ODI

2nd ODI

3rd ODI

4th ODI

WT20I Series

1st T20I

2nd T20I

3rd T20I

4th T20I

References

External links
Pakistan Women tour of West Indies 2011 from Cricinfo

International cricket competitions in 2011
2011 in women's cricket
Women's international cricket tours of the West Indies
Pakistan women's national cricket team tours
2011 in Pakistani women's sport